Rising & Falling is the fourth album by electronic music duo Layo & Bushwacka!.

Track listing

References 

2012 albums
Layo & Bushwacka! albums